Roy of Hollywood (real name Roy Tuckman) has produced, engineered and hosted the "Something's Happening" show on Pacifica Radio station KPFK-FM in Los Angeles since 1977.  His show runs from 12 midnight to 6:00 a.m., Monday night/Tuesday mornings through Thursday night/Friday mornings. Monday is "environment/anything goes" night. Tuesday is "health/alternative medicine" night, mainly featuring Gary Null. Wednesday is politics night. Thursday is "spirituality/mysticism" night, often featuring Alan Watts, Jack Gariss, Colin Wilson, and J. Krishnamurti.

Tuckman was born in Los Angeles, and earned a master's degree in social anthropology from UCLA in 1967. He has been a KPFK staff member since 1972. His awards include a Major Armstrong Award for the documentary "Upton Sinclair: The Reverent Radical", and an AP Best Spot News Coverage award (shared with Elliot Mintz) for his live, on-air interview with Iranian hostage-takers inside the American embassy in Tehran in November 1979.

External links 
Something's Happening (Official Site) - with links to schedules and downloads of recent shows
Fiesta – the Amazon page for the 1989 album of ambient organ music composed and performed by Tuckman
A 2007 interview of Tuckman by Jay Kugelman

Living people
American radio personalities
Pacifica Foundation people
Year of birth missing (living people)